"Isabella" is the 12th episode of the HBO original series The Sopranos. Written by Robin Green and Mitchell Burgess, and directed by Allen Coulter, it originally aired on March 28, 1999.

Starring
 James Gandolfini as Tony Soprano
 Lorraine Bracco as Dr. Jennifer Melfi
 Edie Falco as Carmela Soprano
 Michael Imperioli as Christopher Moltisanti
 Dominic Chianese as Corrado Soprano, Jr.
 Vincent Pastore as Pussy Bonpensiero *
 Steven Van Zandt as Silvio Dante
 Tony Sirico as Paulie Gualtieri
 Robert Iler as Anthony Soprano, Jr.
 Jamie-Lynn Sigler as Meadow Soprano
 Nancy Marchand as Livia Soprano

* = credit only

Guest starring

Synopsis
Tony is deeply depressed after Pussy's unexplained disappearance. He sees a beautiful Italian woman in the Cusamanos' backyard next door. She tells him her name is Isabella and that she is a foreign exchange student staying there while the Cusamanos are away. He takes her out to lunch and she describes the beauty of Avellino, where Tony's grandfather came from.  He has a daydream about Isabella in a rocking chair in a village house, nursing a baby named Antonio.

One day Isabella is no longer there. When the Cusamanos return Tony asks about her and realizes he has been hallucinating. Dr. Melfi instructs him to stop taking lithium, and theorizes that Isabella was an idealized maternal figure.

Mikey, acting through Donnie Paduana, contracts two black gunmen to carry out the hit on Tony. Junior cannot bear to hear the details of the plan when Mikey tries to report.

Chris is concerned about his boss's emotional state and secretly follows him; he unknowingly prevents the hit when he pulls his car up next to the assassins', blocking their view of Tony. Mikey and Donnie urgently meet on the streets about the failed attempt, with Junior hiding in the back seat of Mikey's car. Donnie promises the hit will be the next day and casually remarks that even Tony's mother wants him dead. Junior, fearing Donnie's "big mouth", gestures to Mikey that he should kill Donnie. He does it.

The next day, the assassins make their move. In a ferocious struggle, one of them is killed and the other is briefly dragged along the street as Tony drives away. Elated, he can't help crashing into a parked car. In the hospital, Tony says that his injuries, only minor, occurred in an attempted carjacking, a story that not even A.J. believes. FBI Agent Harris comes to his bed and offers a deal, including immunity from prosecution, which Tony scornfully rejects.

The next day, Livia and Junior call on Tony at home. Livia claims that she doesn't know who Meadow is; Junior later comments on the "good timing" of this apparent memory loss.

Deceased
 Donnie Paduana: shot by Mikey Palmice on orders of Uncle Junior.
 William "Petite" Clayborn: accidentally shot by his partner, Rasheen Ray, in the failed attempt on Tony Soprano's life.

Title reference
Isabella is the Italian exchange student Tony hallucinates.

Music
 The song played at the Bada Bing when Christopher and Silvio discuss Tony's depression is "Ugly Stadium" by Tipsy. 
 The song that is played twice during this episode (when Tony is in his bedroom, and again during the "carjacking") is "Tiny Tears" by Tindersticks.
 The song played as the would-be assassins are stalking Tony at the newsstand is "Cry" by Thornetta Davis
 The song that is played briefly after Tony's meeting with Dr. Melfi, when he runs into Isabella, is "Ballad of Tindersticks (instrumental)" also by Tindersticks.
 The song played when Tony and Isabella have lunch is "Milonga del Angel" by Al Di Meola. 
 The song played while Mikey kills Donnie Paduana is "Temptation Waits" by Garbage.
 The song played over the end credits is "I Feel Free" by Cream.

Filming locations 
Listed in order of first appearance:

 Belleville, New Jersey
 Satin Dolls in Lodi, New Jersey
 North Caldwell, New Jersey
 Montclair, New Jersey
 Greenpoint, Brooklyn
 Van Vleck House in Montclair, New Jersey
 West Orange, New Jersey

Reception
Alan Sepinwall has lauded "Isabella" as one of the greatest episodes of The Sopranos. Emily St. James found the subplot with the titular character to be outlandish, but still described the episode as featuring "classic scene after classic scene".

References

External links
"Isabella"  at HBO

The Sopranos (season 1) episodes
1999 American television episodes
Television episodes directed by Allen Coulter

fr:Isabella (Les Soprano)